Augasma nitens is a moth of the family Coleophoridae. It is found in the Palestinian Territories and Israel.

References

Coleophoridae
Moths described in 1935